Shaka (c. 1787 – c. 1828) was the leader of the Zulu Kingdom in the early 19th century.

Shaka may also refer to:

 Saka (Sanskrit: Shaka), a Scythian tribe or group of tribes of Iranian origin
 Saka calendar, the official civil calendar in use in India
 Shaka era, a calendar era in ancient India, starting in 79 AD (or CE)
 Shaka, a South African automobile brand of Advanced Automotive Design
 King Shaka International Airport, the primary airport serving Durban, South Africa
 Shaka sign, a Hawaiian hand gesture
 Shakya (Japanese: Shaka), an ancient clan or ethnicity in the north-east of South Asia
 Shaka, the Japanese for Shakamuni or Gautama Buddha, the historical Buddha

Persons with the given name
 Shaka Bangura (born 1986), a Sierra Leonean association football player
 Shaka Dee, a Trinidad and Tobago musician
 Shaka Hislop (born 1969), an English association football player
 
 Shaka Loveless (born 1984), a Danish rapper and singer 
 Shaka Sankofa (1963–2000), an American criminal
 Shaka Smart (born 1977), an American basketball coach
 Shaka Sola (born 1977), a Samoan shot putter and discus thrower
 Shaka Toney (born 1998), American football player

Persons with the surname
 Jah Shaka, a British musician
 Tom Shaka (born 1953), an American singer–songwriter

Fictional characters
 Virgo Shaka, a character of the manga/anime Saint Seiya
 Shaka, a character central to the Star Trek: The Next Generation episode "Darmok"

See also
 Saka (disambiguation)
 Chaka (disambiguation)
 Shakka (disambiguation)
 Boom Shaka, a pioneering kwaito music group from South Africa
 Shaka Zulu (album), a 1987 album by South African a cappella group Ladysmith Black Mambazo
 Shaka Zulu (TV series), a 1986 television miniseries about the Zulu leader